Kim Myung-min (born October 8, 1972) is a South Korean actor. He is best known for his leading roles in the television series Immortal Admiral Yi Sun-shin (2004), White Tower (2007), Beethoven Virus (2008), Six Flying Dragons (2015-2016), and Law School (2021), as well as the films Closer to Heaven (2009) and the Detective K film series. His first leading role was in the film, Sorum (2001). Praised for his acting skills, he is often called 'The Acting Expert'.

Career

Early years 

Kim Myung-min debuted as an actor when he won the 6th SBS public talent audition in 1996. Over the next five years he appeared in a number of television series in various supporting roles.

Kim' first leading role came with critically appraised 2001 horror film Sorum, the feature debut of the director Yoon Jong-chan, telling the story of a taxi driver moving into a decrepit building that hides several dark secrets. For this part Kim received Best New Actor award at 2001 Busan Film Critics Awards and Director's Cut Awards

Building on his new status of a lead actor, Kim started to work on several film projects, many of which however ended unfinished, mostly due to financial problems. At that time he also suffered from injuries incurred while he was shooting action scenes.

When he starred in the 2004 KBS family drama More Beautiful than a Flower, he was expected to have a successful career as a lead actor.  However, he was badly injured while performing a stunt and his film contracts kept being withdrawn. This series of unfortunate events led him to quit stage acting in 2004. Kim then decided to end his acting career and emigrate to New Zealand with his family following the birth of his son. A turning point came in his career when he was given the opportunity to play the lead role in the 2004-2005 historical drama Immortal Admiral Yi Sun-shin after producers viewed his work in More Beautiful than a Flower. The 104-episode TV series based on the life of Korea's hero of the Imjin War put Kim in the spotlight and brought him a host of awards including Grand Prize at KBS Drama Awards.

Mainstream success 
Kim was then cast in leading roles, playing a comical ex-gangster in Bad Family and a detective in Open City. He then played a surgeon in two productions: the television series White Tower and film Wide Awake. White Tower was a critical and ratings hit in South Korea, gaining praise for its acting (particularly by Kim), writing, direction, and its intelligent and uncompromising story without concessions to melodrama or romance. Kim won the Best Actor awards at the year-end Baeksang Arts Awards and Grimae Awards, and was chosen as the Best Performer of the year by producers.

Subsequently, his performance as a maestro in the 2008 TV series Beethoven Virus created a sensation in Korea referred to as "Kang Mae Syndrome" and again earned him acclaim from critics and viewers. Kim received the Grand Prize (Daesang) at the MBC Drama Awards and his second Baeksang for Best Actor in television. In late 2008, it was announced that his next project was a film about a character living with Lou Gehrig's disease, titled Closer to Heaven. To realistically portray the role of the dying patient, Kim painstakingly lost 20 kilos during the course of the filming. Kim was widely commended for this feat, and won Best Actor Awards in Korea's leading film ceremonies, the 46th Grand Bell Awards and the 30th Blue Dragon Film Awards.
Closer to Heaven was followed by another film, Man of Vendetta, where Kim portrayed the role of a father for the first time.

In January 2011, Kim took on the role of Joseon's Sherlock Holmes in historical comedy-mystery film Detective K: Secret of the Virtuous Widow. He then starred in sports movie, Pacemaker, where he played a marathon runner. Summer of 2012 saw Kim as a pharmaceutical agent in disaster movie Deranged. The film, directed by Park Jung-woo became the fastest Korean film in 2012 to reach 2 million admissions, eight days after its July 5 release date. and topped the box office for three consecutive weeks. 
Kim then starred in The Spies, his second collaboration with Woo Min-ho, director of his 2010 film, Man of Vendetta. The film is centered on a North Korean agent and his three comrades who are working undercover in South Korea.

Kim made a comeback to the small screen after four years in satire dramedy The King of Dramas, where he played a drama production company CEO.<ref>Lee Hye. "Kim Myung-min to turn into TV series producer in new comedy . 10Asia, 25 July 2012. Retrieved on 23 September 2012.</ref> He next played a brilliant but cynical lawyer who gets into an accident and loses his memory in A New Leaf (2014). In 2015, Kim reprised his role as Detective K in Detective K: Secret of the Lost Island, the second installment in the Detective K series. The historical television series Six Flying Dragons followed, in which he played Jeong Do-jeon, who served as the First Prime Minister of the Joseon Dynasty. He next starred in the disaster film Pandora, portraying the aftermath of an explosion in a nuclear plant.  Crime drama Proof of Innocence followed, where Kim played a former cop-turned-legal broker.

In 2017, Kim starred in the noir  film V.I.P, playing a police detective.; followed by mystery thriller A Day. The same year, he was cast in the period comedy film Monstrum. In 2018, Kim again reprised his role as Detective K in Detective K: Secret of the Living Dead, the third installment in the Detective K series. The same year, he returned to the small screen in the melodrama Miracle That We Met. which won him another Grand Prize at the KBS Drama Awards. In 2019, Kim starred in the war film The Battle of Jangsari. In 2021, he starred in the legal drama series Law School'' playing a prosecutor-turned-professor who teaches criminal law. In 2022, it was reported that the contract with agency C-JeS Entertainment Kim's has expired. Later the same day it was confirmed that the original agency contract had expired.

Filmography

Film

Television series

Music video

Discography

Publicity ambassador
 2010 Seoul National University Bundang Hospital Goodwill Ambassador
 2009 Korea Dental Association, "Ambassador for Oral Hygiene"
 2008 Kia Soul CUV
 2007 Oral Health Care Campaign, "OQ Publicity Ambassador"
 2007 National Election Commission, "Clean Election Publicity Ambassador"
 2007 Yeon-se Severance Health Publicity Ambassador
 2006 National Pension Service
 2005 Social Welfare Society
 2005 The Great Admiral Lee Soon-shin Festival

Awards and nominations

Listicles

References

External links 
MM Entertainment (Kim Myung-min's Agency)
Kim Myung-min International Official Site
Kim Myung-min Japan Official Site
Kim Myung-min Japan Official Site

South Korean male film actors
South Korean male television actors
1972 births
Living people
Male actors from Seoul
21st-century South Korean male actors